Zabrus aciculatus is a species of ground beetle in the Eutroctes subgenus that can be found in Armenia and Turkey.

References

Beetles described in 1864
Beetles of Asia
Zabrus
Taxa named by Hermann Rudolph Schaum